Kittanning (YTB-787) is a United States Navy  named for Kittanning, Pennsylvania.

Construction

The contract for Kittanning was awarded 14 January 1965. She was laid down on 22 December 1965 at Marinette, Wisconsin, by Marinette Marine and launched 29 March 1966.

Operational history

Kittanning was placed in service in the Pacific Fleet 27 October 1966; and in 1967 assigned to Naval Station Yokosuka, Japan, assisting ships of the American and Allied navies in the Far East. It was then sold to a buyer in Panama. Last known location: Busan, South Korea.

References

External links
 

Natick-class large harbor tugs
Ships built by Marinette Marine
1966 ships